Hlohovec District (okres Hlohovec) is a district in the Trnava Region of western Slovakia. District is located on a valley lowlands of Váh river. In its current borders had been established in 1996. Most important economy branches are production of metallurgy products and the pharmaceutical industry. Its administrative seat is town Hlohovec. District is important for its transport location, Leopoldov is a railway hub and a D1 motorway connects the district area to Trnava, Bratislava and other Slovak regions. Hlohovec district consists of 24 municipalities, in two of them are towns.

Municipalities

References

 
Districts of Slovakia